Atlanta's Fifth Ward encompassed mainly what is now the part of downtown and midtown between the west side of Peachtree and the Western and Atlantic Railroad.

1854

The 1848 charter only specified election of six citywide councilmembers, but on January 9, 1854 an ordinance was adopted that divided the town into five wards and two councilmen from each ward would be elected to coincide with the completion of the first official city hall.
The next election with the new rules on January 15, 1855 decided those first Ward bosses who would serve with the short-term mayor, Allison Nelson. The Fifth Ward was laid out west of Ivy and north of A&W Railroad. This ward contained the large homes along Peachtree Street and the southern part, Fairlie-Poplar was also largely residential with warehousing along the western part.

1871

During a huge boom of post-war building, two new wards were added from parts of the First, Fourth and Fifth to reflect the changing look of the city. This would be the layout until the city limits were expanded in 1874.

Parts of the Fourth and Fifth Wards were taken to form a Seventh Ward (grey)  established on December 2, 1871. Specifically from the "junction of Houston and Pryor streets, thence through lot nineteen, between blocks three, one and two, five and six, to the city limits; thence northerly along the city limits to Peachtree Street; thence south along Peachtree Street and Pryor Street to the beginning." And the Fourth was extended "from Ivy Street west to Pryor, and from Houston Street south to the railroad, and that Pryor Street shall be the line between the fourth and fifth wards, and Pryor and Peachtree streets between the fifth and seventh wards." This gave the red-light district to the Fourth and created a new Ward of mostly farmers and to the west, fine residences along Ivy and the east side of Peachtree.

1874

A new city charter increased the radius of the city from one to one and a half miles, reduced the number of wards back to five and created a bicameral council of two councilmen from each ward and a second body of three at-large aldermen was established.

The new Fifth ward layout was from Pryor and tracks north-east to Peachtree, then West Peachtree to city limits, south-west to Foundry and W&A RR and east to origin. Two councilmen would be elected from each ward each year.

In late 1875, an ordinance passed where each year one councilman would be elected from each ward for a two-year term. The first year, 1876 just had one citywide alderman and a single councilman from each ward, and they would be fully staffed two years later.

1883

On November 5, 1883 a Sixth Ward (beige) was carved out of the Fourth and Fifth Wards. In later years wards were added or modified to handle newly annexed parts of the city but the Fifth remained essentially unchanged. The city converted to a district system in 1954.

See also
Atlanta ward system

References
 

Ward 5